Michał Kaliszek (born 17 November 1990 in Toruń, Poland) is a Polish ice dancer who competes with his sister Natalia Kaliszek. They took up ice dancing in 2010. Previously, he competed as a pair skater with his sister and as a men's single skater. His youngest sister, Anna Kaliszek, is also a figure skater.

Programs

Ice dancing career

Pairs career

Competitive highlights

Ice dancing career

Pairs career

Single career

 J. = Junior level
 N. = Novice level

References
 
 Natalia Kaliszek & Michał Kaliszek at the Polish Figure Skating Association
 Natalia Kaliszek & Michał Kalszek at the MKS Axel Toruń club homepage
 Michał Kaliszek at the Polish Figure Skating Association
 Natalia Kaliszek & Michał Kaliszek at tracings.net
 Natalia Kaliszek & Michał Kaliszek at Planète Patinage
 Michał Kaliszek at Figure Skating Online

Polish male ice dancers
Polish male pair skaters
Polish male single skaters
1990 births
Living people
Sportspeople from Toruń